Yayalar (literally "pedestrians" in Turkish) may refer to the following places in Turkey:

 Yayalar, Bitlis, a village
 Yayalar, Kazan, a village and neighborhood in the district of Kazan, Ankara Province
 Yayalar, Kozluk, a village in the district of Kozluk, Batman Province